Aleksandar Bečanović (born 1971 in Nikšić, Montenegro) is a Montenegrin poet, translator and a critic of literature and film.
He has contributed to the Montenegrin weekly Monitor in its culture section.
He is now a part of the cultural magazines Plima and Ars.
He is well known for his fanatic love towards the horror movies.
He lists Howard Hawks as one of his favorite directors.

Bečanović received the Risto Ratković award for best book of poetry in Montenegro in 2002. He also translates material, mostly film theory, from English. He lives in Bar.

At the 2006 Pula Festival of Books and Authors in Croatia, Bečanović was one of the representative writers who presented on Montenegrin poetry.

Bečanović won the 2017 European Union Prize for Literature, for the country of Montenegro, for his novel Arcueil (2015).

Published works 
"All the Scrupulousness"; "Carmilla: Gothic Poem"; "Nothing Discernable"; "Pesoa: On Four Addresses"; "All Apologies: God Bless America", ARS No.4 year 2003 
Ulisova daljina,  1994
Jeste, pjesme, 1996
Ostava, pjesme, 1998
Mjesta u pismu, pjesme, 2001
Očekujem što će iz svega proizaći, 2005
Žanr u savremenom filmu, 2005
Arcueil, 2015

Anthologies
 New European poets, St. Paul, Minn.: Graywolf Press, 2008.

References

1971 births
Living people
Montenegrin poets
Montenegrin male writers
Montenegrin translators